is a high rise apartment building, situated at 1-1-36 Tamagawa, Fukushima-ku, Osaka, Japan.

This building was once highest in Fukushima ward, when constructed on 1998. Also is face to Dōjima River and Dōjima Ōhashi bridge.

Access 
 on the Keihan Nakanoshima Line is next to the building.

See also 
Osaka
Nakanoshima
Shimo-fukushima Park  : public park and sports centre next to this building

Skyscrapers in Osaka
Fukushima-ku, Osaka
Residential skyscrapers in Japan
Residential buildings completed in 1998
1998 establishments in Japan